Folsom Field may refer to:

 Folsom Field, an outdoor football stadium in Boulder, Colorado, United States
 Folsom Field (Alabama), an airport serving Cullman, Alabama, United States (FAA: 3A1)
 Carl Folsom Airport, an airport serving Elba, Alabama, United States (FAA: 14J)